Dennis James Greenland FRS (13 January 1937 – 23 December 2012) was a British soil scientist, and was honorary visiting professor at the University of Reading.

Life
Greenland studied at Portsmouth Grammar School before earning a Ph.D. degree at Christ Church, Oxford in 1954 with his thesis titled The interaction of montmoril-lonite with some organic compounds.
He was a lecturer at the University of Ghana.
He was director of research at the International Institute of Tropical Agriculture.
He was deputy director general of the International Rice Research Institute.
He taught at the University of Reading from 1988.

Works
P H Greenland, D J Nye, The Soil Under Shifting Cultivation 1960
Cherish the Earth FAO, 1994
The Sustainability of Rice Farming CABI, January 4, 1997,

References

External links
NPP Principal Investigators and Reviewers

1937 births
2012 deaths
Fellows of the Royal Society
Academics of the University of Reading
Alumni of Christ Church, Oxford
British soil scientists